Nájera is a surname. Notable people with the surname include:

Antonio Vallejo-Nájera (1889–1960), Spanish psychiatrist
Ariel Castillo Nájera (born 1955), Mexican politician
Carlos Antonio Reyes Nájera (born 1961), Guatemalan chess player
Eduardo Nájera (born 1976), Mexican basketball player
Elisa Nájera (born 1986), Mexican TV host, model and beauty pageant titleholder
Francisco Nájera (born 1983), Colombian footballer
Fredy Renán Nájera (born 1977), Honduran politician
José Manuel Nájera (born 1988), Colombian footballer
Juan Carlos Nájera (born 1981), Guatemalan triple jumper and coach
Lourdes Gutiérrez Nájera, American cultural anthropologist
Manuel Nájera (born 1952), Mexican footballer
Manuel Gutiérrez Nájera (1859–1895), Mexican writer and political figure
Maricruz Nájera, Mexican actress
Oscar Ramón Nájera (born 1950), Honduran politician
Pedro Nájera (born 1929), Mexican footballer
Rosa María Avilés Nájera (born 1951), Mexican politician
Rossana Nájera (born 1980), Mexican actress